INS Bangaram (T65) the lead ship of the  of the Indian Navy is designed for interdiction against fast moving surface vessels and for search-and-rescue operations in coastal areas and in the exclusive economic zone. Named after Bangaram in Lakshadweep, the vessel was designed and built by Garden Reach Shipbuilders and Engineers. The diesel generators on board are supplied by Cummins India. The electronic equipment on board is from Bharat Electronics Limited, ECIL and Hindustan Aeronautics Limited.

Operations

In Dec 2016 INS Bangaram was operationally deployed in the rescue of 800 tourist alongside ,  and LCU 38 from the Havelock Island and ferried them to Port Blair as a result of severe cyclonic storm in the Bay of Bengal.

In Mar 2017 the warship alongside INS Karmuk (P64) visited Yangon in Myanmar to take part in the 5th Indo-Myanmar coordinated patrol CORPAT.

References

Bangaram-class patrol vessels
Ships built in India
2004 ships